Min River or Minjiang may refer to:

Min River (Sichuan) (岷江), in Sichuan, China
Min River (Fujian) (闽江), in Fujian, China

See also 
 Min (disambiguation)